Miles Davis Quintet: Freedom Jazz Dance: The Bootleg Series, Vol. 5 is a 3-CD compilation that collects studio recordings by jazz trumpeter Miles Davis that were recorded between 1966 and 1968. The album contains remastered versions, alternate takes, and conversations among the musicians.

Davis recorded this music with what is sometimes called his second great quintet: Wayne Shorter on saxophone, Herbie Hancock on piano, Ron Carter on bass, and Tony Williams on drums. Most of the music was recorded for the album Miles Smiles at the 30th Street Studio, a former church in New York City, in 1966.

Track listing

Personnel
Miles Davis – trumpet
Wayne Shorter – tenor saxophone
Herbie Hancock – piano
Ron Carter – bass
Tony Williams – drums

References

2016 compilation albums
Miles Davis compilation albums